Sevinj Nurugizi (August 22, 1964) is a children's writer, a member of the Azerbaijan Writers’ Union since 2001 and a member of the Azerbaijan Journalists’ Union since 1999.

Biography
Sevinj Nurugizi Imanova was born on August 22, 1964 in Baku.

She left the secondary school in Agdam District. In 1981, she entered the M.F.Akhundov  Institute of Russian Language and Literature. In 1986, she graduated from the university with distinction and started to work as a teacher of the Russian language and literature at a secondary school of Şelli-Garadaghly village of Aghdam District.

From March, 2003 she worked as a deputy editor-in-chief at “Madaniyyat” newspaper of the Ministry of Culture of the Azerbaijan Republic. From January, 2006 she worked as a director of the creative team of “Jirtdan” and “Umid” children's magazines of Minamedia publishing house and was the editor and presenter of “Chokhbilmish” children's program presented at the Ijtimai Radio for six days of the week. From 2007, she was editor-in-chief and head of Children's Literature department at “Tahsil” and “Aspoligraf” publishing houses.

Creativity
Her literary and journalistic articles are frequently published in the press. Her theatrical play called “Revenge”, dedicated to Garabagh events, tortures of refugees from Garabagh and the horrors of the war, was out on the stage of A.Hagverdiyev Drama Theatre of Aghdam and “Dolls” theatrical play was staged at State Puppet Theatre of Salyan.

1. The laureate of the 2002 Tofig Mahmoud award for the best child work of the Writers' Union of Azerbaijan

2. The first candidate of Hans Christian Andersen Award and Gold Medal for International Children's Books Council for 2014 in Azerbaijan.

3. Winner of the first place for "Canakkale Impassable" poem in the "Canakkale-100" competition announced by the Turkish Embassy in Azerbaijan jointly with the Azerbaijani Writers' Union in 2015.

4. The winner of the "Golden Word" literary competition of the Ministry of Culture and Tourism of Azerbaijan for the book "Travel to Ancient Baku" in 2015.

5. The book "Travel to Ancient Baku" was awarded the First Place in the International Book Art Contest held in Moscow in 2015.

6. The winner of second place for "Edam" story in "Literary Freedom - 2015" story competition

7. The winner of the first place in the nomination for prose and drama in the competition "The best prose, essay, drama works for younger schoolchildren" was held by the Ministry of Education of Azerbaijan.

8. 20 episod series -"Qəza balası Qaqa” was awarded for the first place for its concept in the project “I have an idea” which was announced by Azanfilm.

9. The poem “For Khojaly” has succeeded in the “Khojaly Literary Prize” competition which was held by the representative of the Azerbaijan-European Organization (TEAS) in the United Kingdom in 2017.

Works
1.“The Kite” (Baku, Adiloghlu. 2002, 108 pages)

2.“Yellow girl, Dizz and Vizz” (Baku, Oscar. 2003, 26 pages)

3.“Story of the White Cock” (Baku, CBS. 2005, 12 pages)

4.“Revenge” (Baku, Vektor. 2005, 132 pages)

5.“Two days with Jiya” (Baku, Oscar. 2007, 32 pages)

6.“Adventures of Ipekche” (Baku, Oscar. 2007, 28 pages)

7.“Fairytale of the unusual village” (In Azerbaijani and Russian languages. “Fairytale of the unusual village”, 16 pages, “Animals”, 16 pages, “Play and paint”, 8 pages. Baku, Tahsil. 2009)

8.“Bozgulag and the seasons” (In Azerbaijani and Russian languages. “Bozgulag and the seasons”, 16 pages, “The seasons”, 16 pages, “Play and paint”, 8 pages. Baku, Tahsil. 2009)

9.“Hide and seek in the wardrobe” (In Azerbaijani and Russian languages. “Hide and seek in the wardrobe”, 12 pages, “Clothes”, 12 pages, “Play and paint”, 8 pages. Baku, Tahsil. 2009)

10.“Murad’s dream” (“Murad’s dream”, 8 pages, “Meals”, 12 pages, “Play and paint”, 8 pages. Baku, Tahsil. 2009)

11.“Find the riddle” (Baku, Tahsil, 12 pages, 2009)

12.“Aghja and Jubbulu” (In Azerbaijani and Russian languages. Baku, Tahsil, 12 pages, 2009)

13.“Aysu and the Moon” (In Azerbaijani and Russian languages. Baku, Tahsil, 2009)

14.“Mountain with a trunk” (Baku, Tahsil. 24 pages, 2010)

15.“The small alphabet” (Baku, Aspoligraf, 196 pages, 2010)

16.“Dede Gorgud” (Adopted version for children. In Azerbaijani and Russian languages. Baku, Aspoligraf, 67 pages, 2010)

17.“Babek” (Baku, Aspoligraf. 16 pages, 2010)

18.“Shah Ismayil Khatai” (Baku, Aspoligraf. 12 pages, 2010)

19.“Aghabeyim Agha” (Baku, Aspoligraf. 16 pages, 2010)

20.“Little sparrow” One-act children's opera. Sevinj Nurugizi and Ogtay Rajabov. (Mutarjim. 2011)

21.“Bozgulag and the seasons” in Russian. Translated by Alesya Kerlyukevich and Ragenda Malakhoyski. Belarus, Minsk, Zvezda. 2014, 16 pages.

22. "Traveling to Ancient Baku" (in Azerbaijani and English languages, Baku, Education, 164 pages)

23. "Musical, mathematical math" (Sevinj Nuruqizi, Oktay Rajabov. Education, 2017, 60 pages)

24. “Let’s learn the letter A” (Baku, Tahsil, 8 pages, 2017)

25. “Let’s learn the letter B” (Baku, Tahsil, 8 pages, 2017)

26. “Let’s learn the letter C” (Baku, Tahsil, 8 pages, 2017)

27. “Let’s learn the letter Ç” (Baku, Tahsil, 8 pages, 2017)

Translations
1.“Fairytales”. Compiled and translated by Sevinj Nurugizi. (Baku, Tahsil. 36 pages, 2009)

2.“Three tengus and a badger”. Compiled and translated by Sevinj Nurugizi. (Baku, Aspoligraf. 16 pages, 2010)

3.“Issumbosi”. Compiled and translated by Sevinj Nurugizi. (Baku, Aspoligraf. 16 pages, 2010)

4. What a fairytale, fairytale. 1st part. ”. Compiled and translated by Sevinj Nurugizi. (Baku, Aspoligraf. 88 pages, 2012)

5. What a fairytale, fairytale. 2nd part. ”. Compiled and translated by Sevinj Nurugizi. (Baku, Aspoligraf. 88 pages, 2012)

6. Gift from the Sun. Compiled and translated by Sevinj Nurugizi. (Baku, Aspoligraf. 88 pages, 2013)

7.Order of the yellow woodpecker. Compiled and translated by Sevinj Nurugizi. (Baku, Aspoligraf. 88 pages, 2013)

8.Ales Karlyukevich. The squirrel writes composition. Compiled and translated by Sevinj Nurugizi. (Baku, Aspoligraf. 88 pages, 2013)

Textbooks
1. Heyat bilgisi (Life skills). Evaluation tests. 1st form. Author Sevinj Nurugizi (Baku, Aspoligraf. 48 pages, 2011)

2. Heyat bilgisi (Life skills). Summative evaluation tests. 2nd form. Author Sevinj Nurugizi (Baku, Aspoligraf. 2010)

3. Heyat bilgisi (Life skills). Summative evaluation tests. 3rd form. Author Sevinj Nurugizi (Baku, Aspoligraf. 2010)

4. Heyat bilgisi (Life skills). Summative evaluation tests. 4th form. Author Sevinj Nurugizi (Baku, Aspoligraf. 2010)

5."Music” textbook. For the 1st – 4th forms of primary schools. Edited by Sevinj Nurugizi

6.“Music”. Methodical textbook for teachers. For the 1st – 7th forms of schools. Edited by Sevinj Nurugizi

7.“Technology” textbook. For the 1st – 4th forms of primary schools. Edited by Sevinj Nurugizi

8.“Technology” textbook. Methodical textbook for teachers. For the 1st – 7th forms of schools. Edited by Sevinj Nurugizi

Musical compositions to her lyrics
1.“Little sparrow”. One-act children's opera. Music by Ogtay Rajabov, lyrics by Sevinj Nurugizi

2.“Musicians from Bremen”. Directed by Alakbar Huseynov, music by Jahangir Zulfugarov, and lyrics by Sevinj Nurugizi

3. "Spring Girl's Legend". Opera. Music by Ogtay Rajabov and lyrics by Sevinj Nurugizi

Songs
1.“Icherisheher”. Music by Ogtay Rajabov, lyrics by Sevinj Nurugizi

2.“Novruz geldi” (“Novruz arrived”). Music by Ogtay Rajabov, lyrics by Sevinj Nurugizi

3.“Giz galasi” (“Maiden Tower”). Music by Ogtay Rajabov, lyrics by Sevinj Nurugizi

4.“Sevgi valsi” (“Love waltz”). Music by Ogtay Rajabov, lyrics by Sevinj Nurugizi

5.“Mubarekdir toyunuz” (“Merry wedding”). Music by Ogtay Rajabov, lyrics by Sevinj Nurugizi

6.“Eynekler” (“Eyeglasses”). Music by Imruza, lyrics by Sevinj Nurugizi

7.“Gel, igidim, gel” (“Come, my hero, come”). Music by Imruza, lyrics by Sevinj Nurugizi

8.“Gunesh” (“The Sun”). Music by Maryam Alibeyli, lyrics by Sevinj Nurugizi

9.“Fesiller” (“The seasons”). Music by Maryam Alibeyli, lyrics by Sevinj Nurugizi

10.“Bakim” (“My Baku”). Music by Maryam Alibeyli, lyrics by Sevinj Nurugizi

11.“Dostlar” (“Friends”). Music by Maryam Alibeyli, lyrics by Sevinj Nurugizi

12.“Arzular” (“Dreams”). Music by Maryam Alibeyli, lyrics by Sevinj Nurugizi

13.“Dilim” (“My language”). Music by Shahin Yagubzadeh, lyrics by Sevinj Nurugizi

14.“Anam” (“My mother”). Music by Maryam Alibeyli, lyrics by Sevinj Nurugizi

References 

1964 births
Living people
Azerbaijani fiction writers
Azerbaijani women writers
20th-century Azerbaijani women writers
20th-century Azerbaijani writers
Azerbaijani women children's writers